Serena Chelsea "Serenity" McKay (September 30, 1997 – April 22 or 23, 2017) was an Indigenous woman from Manitoba, Canada, whose murder was video recorded and posted on social media—being streamed on Facebook Live, in particular. McKay preferred to go by the name "Serenity".

Her body was found on 23 April 2017 in Sagkeeng First Nation, northeast of Winnipeg, Manitoba. According to CBC News, two videos of the crime circulated, with the longer version sitting on Facebook for four hours on April 26 before it was removed from the site after it was reported. The teenage girls who pleaded guilty to the murder of McKay, their former schoolmate, were aged 16 and 17 at the time of their arrest.

Biography
Serena Chelsea McKay, who preferred to go by the name "Serenity," was born September 30, 1997, to Harvey McKay and Delores Daniels. Her siblings include sister Michelle McKay, and brothers Joshua Daniels, Alexander McKay, and Jonathan McKay. 

McKay grew up in Winnipeg, and had spent time in Manitoba's Pine Creek, Peguis, and George Gordon First Nations. Though living in the neighbouring community of Pine Creek First Nation, she attended Sagkeeng Anicinabe High School, where she was in the 12th grade at the time of her death. The school would grant McKay a posthumous diploma at her class' convocation in June 2017, as well as creating a scholarship in her name.

Murder and video
It is not exactly known whether McKay died on April 22 or April 23: she was last seen on the evening of 22 April 2017 and was reported missing to the RCMP detachment in the neighbouring town of Powerview at 6pm on 23 April; a dead body—later confirmed to be Serena McKay—was found two hours after the missing-person report, at 8pm, in Sagkeeng.

The killing was filmed (on a cell phone, apparently) and posted on social media; the graphic material circulated in both a short and long version on Facebook. The video depicts a bloodied, barely-conscious young woman lying on the ground, as she is repeatedly kicked and punched in the head. In addition to the victim's blood and facial injuries, the longer video also shows her head being stomped on by a heavy boot, as well as the sound of bones cracking, during the assault.

Both female and male voices can be heard in the video, but it is unclear how many people are around her other than two females. During the assault, the victim cries out, "I'm so sorry," though there is no available context as to what she is sorry for or why she is being attacked. A female voice says to the victim, "If you send anyone after me I will kill you. I will fucking kill you myself."

Later in the evening of the murder, the younger suspect sent out a Snapchat photo, covered in blood and smiling, with the caption, "just chilling." According to a supposed instant-message exchange between one of the alleged suspects to a resident of Sagkeeng, she broke the nose of the victim, who subsequently left but was nonetheless "OK" and "up and walking." The suspect also mentioned that the victim's nose was "bleeding lots.”

A pathologist testified during the trial of the two suspected killers that McKay likely died of hypothermia, as she was unable to seek protection from the cold due to her injuries and the amount of alcohol in her system. The court also heard that McKay had 67 injuries on her body at the time of death.

Circulation of video 
The video of the murder was circulated in both a short and long version on Facebook, on which the video remained for at least three days before its removal.

The short version of the video was removed after Sagkeeng Grand Chief Derrick Henderson made a request to Facebook, while the long version was removed from the site after CBC News reported it to Facebook and the RCMP. According to CBC, the longer version sat on the site for four hours on April 26 before its removal.

Moreover, despite being removed from the site itself, the video can still be shared on the site through Facebook Messenger, according to RCMP. Though posting videos of attacks online is not illegal in itself, people who film attacks and do not come to the aid of the victim can be charged with being an accessory. As such, because the video is being shared via personal messages, police are doubtful of Facebook's ability to control or stop the spread of such material.

Suspects and investigation

Investigation 
McKay's beaten body was found on April 23 near a home in Sagkeeng, two hours after she was reported missing. Sagkeeng resident Alma Kakikepinace was among the first to discover McKay's body. Two teenagers (aged 16 and 17, respectively, at the time) were subsequently arrested.

The online video was brought to the attention of McKay's high-school principal, Claude Guimond, by her classmates on April 24, the day after McKay's body was found. Upon seeing the face of the victim, Guimond believed it to be McKay and forwarded the evidence to Powerview RCMP. Also that day, the younger suspect (16) spoke to a school counsellor about the beating and later turned herself into the RCMP.

One of the suspects was also accused of writing instant messages (IM) about the death. The Winnipeg Free Press reported that it received an IM exchange from “a resident of the reserve” in which one of the alleged suspects writes at first, “We fought, I broke her nose then that happened, she left after, she was OK. She was up and walking.” A few hours later, the suspect wrote, “She was found dead bro… Promise me say when we fought it wasn’t that bad. Her nose was just bleeding lots… I’m fuckin scared. Promise me, you won’t tell em I fought her deadly. Please bro… Say after we closed the door, she left.”

On the week of 1 May 2017, the RCMP ruled the death to be a homicide, charging the two girls with second-degree murder. While it is known that the two girls went to school with McKay, the Canadian Youth Criminal Justice Act prohibits releasing names of accused or convicted youth-criminals, and the suspects' names cannot be revealed publicly.

Trial and detention 
A pathologist testified during their trial that McKay likely died of hypothermia, unable to seek protection from the cold because of her injuries and the amount of alcohol in her system. The two girls were charged with, and pleaded guilty to, second-degree murder, and were ordered to undergo a psychological assessment. Following their guilty pleas, prosecutors had also tried to seek adult sentences for the teenage girls, arguing that a youth sentence (maximum of 3 years) would be too lenient.

In January 2018, the younger of the two suspects, 17 years old at this time, was subject to sentencing hearings at Winnipeg youth court, where she pleaded guilty to manslaughter. According to her defence lawyer, she was a "panicked young person" and thus should be sentenced as a youth.

The older of the two, 17 years old at the time of arrest, was remanded to the Manitoba Youth Center (MYC)—a youth prison which has both remand, post remand, and convict units—and subsequently pleaded guilty to the charge. On 26 May 2017, the 17-year-old suspect had her first trial at a Manitoba Provincial Court in Winnipeg, where both the defense lawyers and prosecutors requested a psychological test. Crown prosecutor Jennifer Comack said there were 24 victim impact statements from family and friends, in addition to those from people who did not know McKay. Provincial court Judge Rocky Pollack sentenced her in June 2018 to 40 months (3 years & 4 months) in prison followed by another 23.5 months (1 year & 11 months) of conditional supervision—the maximum youth sentence in Canada for taking a life. One condition of her sentence was that the two girls are not allowed to communicate with one another while the sentence is being served. The girl has since claimed that she is very sorry for what she has done.

In November 2020, the older suspect, now 20 years old, was moved to Women's Correctional Centre, an adult facility in Headingley. Also that year, she was denied a request for an early release so that she could return to her First Nation community and take steps to enrol at the University of Manitoba. Judge Pollack rejected the request in a written decision on August 26, saying that the woman "still does not appreciate the significance of her consequences." Some reasons include: forging the signature of a MYC staff member in order to get a letter released in the mail; tattooing herself; her involvement with a group that refused to comply with lockup orders; and getting disciplined for not taking medication.

In a handwritten document  by the woman, called "My Life Story", she wrote about the night of the murder:A couple drinks turned into a full weekend of binge drinking. Waking up a Monday, and finding out you were involved in a murder was so shocking. I couldn't remember much of that weekend but watching a video a friend showed me was brutal. I sat back and denied it all because I'm not a violent person.

Mourning and impact 
On April 25, McKay's school, Sagkeeng Anicinabe High School, held a healing ceremony for students and staffs, for which councillors were brought in to assist with.

A vigil was held in Sagkeeng's powwow grounds at 7 pm on April 27, following a singing and drumming circle. Another vigil was held on April 29, this time in Winnipeg, with hundreds marching. The vigil began at 6:30pm at Winnipeg's Thunderbird House, where people gathered for drumming and singing. From there, the Bear Clan Patrol led the group down Waterfront Drive to Oodena Circle at The Forks, where the vigil would wrap up with drumming and donated tobacco and refreshments.

McKay's funeral was held at Westwood Church in Winnipeg on 1 May 2017; she was buried in the city as well.

On 23 June 2017, at Sagkeeng Anicinabe High School's graduation ceremony, what would have been McKay's seat was left empty and marked with a red graduation gown and diploma to honour her memory. The school would also grant McKay a posthumous diploma at the ceremony, as well as creating a scholarship in her name.

In February 2018, about 20 people including McKay's family and friends gathered in front of the Manitoba Legislative Building to protest the perpetrators' reduced sentences. Starting at the Legislature, the protesters walked up Memorial Boulevard and through part of downtown. The previous month, McKay's mother spoke at the second annual Women's March in Winnipeg.

See also
 Law, government, and crime in Winnipeg
 Manitoba Justice
 Missing and murdered Indigenous women
 Tina Fontaine

References

External links
Serena McKay
Attackers threaten to kill victim in video linked to Serena McKay homicide." CBC News.
"Girls arrested in homicide of Serena McKay, 19, in Sagkeeng First Nation." CBC News.
"Drugs at the root of violence on the First Nation where 19 year old was murdered." APTN. 2017 April 26.
"Facebook isn't doing enough to control violent posts, says expert." CBC News.
Vigils and obituaries
"SERENA CHELSEA MCKAY (obituary)," Passages. Winnipeg Free Press.
"'It was all about love': funeral for Serena McKay celebrates how she lived." CBC News. 2017 May 1.
"'We're all feeling it,' says organizer of Winnipeg vigil in honour of slain Sagkeeng First Nation teen." CBC News. 2017 April 28.
"In Pictures: Vigil, march for Serena McKay." CTV News.

2010s missing person cases
2017 crimes in Canada
2017 in Manitoba
2017 murders in Canada
2018 in Manitoba
April 2017 crimes in North America
Deaths from hypothermia
Deaths by person in Canada
Female murder victims
Filmed killings
Formerly missing people
History of Manitoba
Missing person cases in Canada
Murder committed by minors
Murder in Manitoba
Sagkeeng First Nation
Violence against Indigenous women in Canada